Mainstay is a Christian rock band from Minneapolis, USA.

Mainstay may also refer to:

mainstay (rope), a cable, line, or rope from the top of the main-mast to the foot of the fore-mast on a sailing vessel, forming part of the vessel's standing rigging
Beriev A-50, a Russian AWACS aircraft
USS Mainstay (AM-261), a US Navy minesweeper
Mainstay Lake in Guyana